Ravindra Chavan is a leader of Bharatiya Janata Party and member of the Maharashtra Legislative Assembly elected in 2009, 2014 and 2019 who represents Dombivali Assembly of Maharashtra State.

Ravindra Chavan is the Minister of State for Ports, Medical Education, Information and Technology, Food and Civil supplies, Consumer protection Government of Maharashtra.

Within BJP

President, Kalyan BJYM (2005)

Legislative

Corporator - Ward No. 96 Kalyan-Dombivali Municipal Corporation– (October 2005)
Member, Standing Committee Kalyan-Dombivali Municipal Corporation - (October 2006)
Standing Committee Chairman, Kalyan-Dombivali Municipal Corporation - (October 2007)
Member, Maharashtra Legislative Assembly - 3 consecutive terms, since 2009

References

Living people
People from Kalyan-Dombivli
Maharashtra MLAs 2009–2014
1964 births
Maharashtra MLAs 2014–2019
Bharatiya Janata Party politicians from Maharashtra